Tshekardocoleoidea is a superfamily in the extinct suborder Protocoleoptera that contains the following families:

†Coleopsidae 
†Labradorocoleoidae  
†Oborocoleidae 
†Tshekardocoleidae

References

 
Beetle superfamilies
Taxa named by Boris Rohdendorf